Mlačište is a village in the municipality of Crna Trava, Serbia. According to the 2002 census, the village has a population of 29 people. 15 tumuli have been found but not excavated on the Mali Čemernik (Čemernik).

References

Populated places in Jablanica District